Justus Drew Doenecke (born 1938) is an American historian, writer, and professor. His 2000 book, Storm on the Horizon: the Challenge to American Intervention, 1939-1941, received the Herbert Hoover Book Award from the Herbert Hoover Presidential Library and Museum. Doenecke is Professor Emeritus at New College of Florida.

Education
Doenecke was born on March 5, 1938, in Brooklyn, New York, to Justus Christian and Eleanore Howard (née Smith) Doenecke. In 1960, he graduated magna cum laude from Colgate University with his Bachelor of Arts degree. Doenecke earned his Master's degree and Ph.D. in History from Princeton University in 1962 and 1966, respectively.

Career
Doenecke was an Instructor of History at Colgate University from 1963 to 1964, and was instructor, then assistant professor, at Ohio Wesleyan University from 1965 to 1969. He rose from assistant professor to full professor at New College of Florida (from 1975 to 2001 New College of the University of South Florida) from 1966 to 2005, before being named Professor Emeritus of History in 2005.

He is the author of more than ten books. Doenecke's book Storm on the Horizon: The Challenge to American Intervention, 1939-1941 was the 2000 recipient for the Herbert Hoover Book Award for best book on any topic of American history within the years 1914–64, the years of Hoover's public life. The topics of Doenecke's books vary. He has written about the presidency of James A. Garfield and Chester A. Arthur, the United States' entry into World War I, the New Deal, Franklin D. Roosevelt's general foreign policy, World War II, and the Cold War. Doenecke has also contributed to various reference books and has written articles and book reviews for scholarly journals.

Doenecke's documentary edition of the America First Committee won the Arthur S. Link Prize for Documentary Editing from the Society for Historians of American Foreign Relations.

Doenecke is a member of many associations, which are as follows: Society for Historians of American Foreign Relations, the American Historical Association, Organization of American Historians, Phi Beta Kappa Society, and the Historical Society of the Episcopal Church.

Personal life
Doenecke married Carol Anne Soukup, merchandizer and later a pastel artist, on March 21, 1970. He identifies as Episcopalian.

Publications

Articles & Essays
 "Harry Elmer Barnes." Wisconsin Magazine of History, vol. 56, no. 4 (Summer 1973), pp. 311–23. .
 "Non-interventionism of the Left: The Keep America Out of the War Congress, 1938-41." Journal of Contemporary History, vol. 12, no. 2 (Apr. 1977), pp. 221-236. .
 "Principle and Expediency: The State Department and Palestine, 1948." Journal of Libertarian Studies, vol. 2, no. 4 (1978), pp. 343–56.
 "The Isolationist as Collectivist: Lawrence Dennis and The Coming of World War II." Journal of Libertarian Studies, vol. 3, no. 2 (1979), pp. 191-207.
 "Toward an Isolationist Braintrust: The Foundation for Foreign Affairs." World Affairs, vol. 143, no. 3 (Winter 1980), pp. 264–77. .
 "The Anti-interventionist Tradition: Leadership and Perceptions." Literature of Liberty, vol. 4, no. 2 (Summer 1981), pp. 7–67. Full issue. A bibliographical essay.
 "Edwin M. Borchard, John Bassett Moore, and Opposition to American Intervention in World War II." Journal of Libertarian Studies, vol. 6, no. 1 (Winter 1982), pp. 1–34.
 "American Isolationism, 1939-1941." Journal of Libertarian Studies, vol. 6, no. 3-4 (1982), pp. 201–16.
 "Explaining the Antiwar Movement, 1939-1941: The Next Assignment." Journal of Libertarian Studies, vol. 8, no. 1 (Winter 1986), pp. 139–62.
 "The Anti-Interventionism of Herbert Hoover." Journal of Libertarian Studies, vol. 8, no. 2 (Summer 1987), pp. 311-40.
 "How FDR Created the Surveillance State." The Daily Beast (May 10, 2015).
 "Naught Without Labor: A Half Century of Exploration into Twentieth-Century American Intervention and Its Critics." H-DIPLO (Mar. 2020).

Bibliographies
 The Literature of Isolationism: A Guide to Non-Interventionist Scholarship, 1930-1972. Colorado Springs: Ralph Myles (1972).
 "Literature of Isolationism, 1972–1983: A Bibliographic Guide." Journal of Libertarian Studies, vol. 7, no. 1 (1983), pp. 157–184. Full issue.
 This essay supplements (not replaces) the earlier Literature of Isolationism (1972). Written for a 1980 seminar sponsored by the World Without War Council in Berkeley, California, then updated further.

Books
 From Isolation to War, 1931-1941. New York: Thomas Y. Crowell Company (1968).
 The Literature of Isolationism: A Guide to Non-Interventionist Scholarship, 1930-1972. Colorado Springs: Ralph Myles (1972).
 Not to the Swift: the Old Isolationists in the Cold War Era. Lewisberg, Pa.: Bucknell University Press (1979). .
The Diplomacy of Frustration: The Manchurian Crisis of 1931-1933 as Revealed in the Papers of Stanley K. Hornbeck (1981). .
The Presidencies of James A. Garfield & Chester A. Arthur. Lawrence: Regents Press of Kansas (1981). .
When the Wicked Rise: American Opinion-Makers and the Manchurian Crisis of 1931-1933. Lewisberg, Pa.: Bucknell University Press (1984). .
In Danger Undaunted: the Anti-Interventionist Movement of 1940-1941 as Revealed in the Papers of the America First Committee (1990). .
The Battle Against Intervention, 1939-1941. Malabar, Fla.: Krieger (1997). . .
Storm on the Horizon: The Challenge to American Intervention, 1939-1941 (2000). . .
The New Deal. Malabar, Fla.: Krieger (2003). . .
Debating Franklin D. Roosevelt's Foreign Policies, with Mark A. Stoler. New York: Rowman & Littlefield (2005). . .
 Nothing Less Than War: A New History of America's Entry into World War I. University Press of Kentucky (2011). . .

Book reviews
 Review of Selling War: The British Propaganda Campaign Against American "Neutrality" in World War II, by Nicholas J. Cull. Independent Review, vol. 1, no. 2 (Fall 1996).
 Review of Desperate Deception: British Covert Operations in the United States, 1939–1944, by Thomas E. Mahl. Independent Review, vol. 4, no. 1 (Summer 1999).
 Review of Means of Grace: A Year of Weekly Devotions, by Fleming Rutledge. Anglican Theological Review, vol. 104, no. 1 (Feb. 2022), pp. 99-100. .

Contributions
 "Power, Markets, and Ideology: The Isolationist Response to Roosevelt Policy, 1940-1941." In: Liggio, Leonard P., and James J. Martin, eds. Watershed of Empire: Essays on New Deal Foreign Policy, with a preface by Felix Morley. Colorado Spring: Ralph Myles (1976). pp. 132-161. .

Encyclopedic and reference
 "Isolationism." In: Oxford Research Encyclopedia of American History. Oxford University Press. .

References

Further reading
 Staff writer (Jan. 26, 2022). "An Interview with Justus D. Doenecke, Author of More Precious than Peace." Notre Dame Press.
 DeRensis, Hunter (Jul. 8, 2022). "The Dean of Non-Interventionism." Interview with Justus D. Doenecke. The American Conservative.

External links

Dr. Justus Doenecke at Pritzker Military Museum & Library (video) via YouTube

1938 births
Living people
21st-century American historians
American male non-fiction writers
Colgate University alumni
Princeton University alumni
Historians from New York (state)